is a passenger railway station operated by the Takamatsu-Kotohira Electric Railroad in Takamatsu, Kagawa, Japan.  It is operated by the private transportation company Takamatsu-Kotohira Electric Railroad (Kotoden) and is designated station "N03".

Lines
Hanazono Station is a station on the Kotoden Nagao Line and is located 0.9 km from the terminus of the line at Kawaramachi Station and 2.6 kilometers from Takamatsu-Chikkō Station.

Layout
The station consists of two opposed side platforms connected by a level crossing. The station is unattended.

Adjacent stations

History
Hanazono Station opened on August 1, 1954.

Surrounding area
Kagawa Prefectural Route 43 Chutoku Mitani Takamatsu Line
Kagawa Prefectural Road No. 155 Mure Chushin Line
Takamatsu Municipal Hanazono Elementary School

Passenger statistics

See also
 List of railway stations in Japan

References

External links

  

Railway stations in Japan opened in 1954
Railway stations in Takamatsu